Vincent Mantsoe (born 1971) is a South African dancer and choreographer.  Raised in the Soweto township outside Johannesburg, he combines the street dance of his childhood with traditional and contemporary dance styles. Spirituality and the cultural influences of African, Aboriginal Australian, Asian, contemporary, and ballet traditions are important influences on Mantsoe's work. He is also the founder of Association Noa.

Career

Education
Mantsoe began his training in 1990 with Johannesburg's Moving Into Dance Company.

Awards 
 1992 IGI Dance Umbrella (South Africa Johannesburg)
 1995 Standard Bank Young Artist of the Year (South Africa)
 1996 First Prize at Dance Encounters of Contemporary African Dance (Luanda, Angola)
 1996 FNB Male Choreographer of the Year (South Africa)
 1996 Sixth Recontres Choreographiques Internationales awards for Independent Choreographers (France, Paris)
 1998 Sixth Recontres Choreographiques Internationales awards for Independent Choreographers (France, Paris)
 1999 FNB VITA awards for Choreographer of the Year and Most Outstanding Performance by a Male Dancer (South Africa)
 1999 Prix de Peuple, Festival International de Nouvelle Danse (Montreal Canada) –
 2001 FNB Vita Choreographer of the Year and Best Male (South Africa)
 2006 FNB Dance Umbrella and Gauteng MEC for Best Choreography and Best Male Dance
 2007 Black Theatre Alliance Awards for best Choreography in Music and Dance (USA, Chicago)

Solo Work 
 1992, African Soul
 1993, Gula `Bird`
 1997, Mpheyane `Deceit`
 1998, Phokwane
 2000, Barena `Chief`
 2001, Motswa-Hole `Person from far away`
 2002, Bupiro-Mukiti `Dance of life`
 2003, NDAA `Greetings`
 2005, NTU `Nothing`
 2007, EBHOFOLO `This madness`
 2009, LEFA (solo work), Introdanse (Netherlands, Arhem)
 2011, NTU/// Recreation

References

External links
 Artist Biography
 Artist Website
 Inspiration
 Review by Sanjoy Roy, The Guardian
 Review by Roslyn Sulcas, The New York Times
 Interview with Thea Nerissa Barnes, Ballet-Dance Magazine

1971 births
South African male dancers
People from Soweto
Living people
Contemporary dancers